is a Japanese football player. He plays for Urawa Red Diamonds.

National team career
In June 2011, Iwanami was elected for the Japan U-17 national team for the 2011 U-17 World Cup and he played four matches as captain. In August 2016, he was elected to the Japan U-23 national team for the 2016 Summer Olympics, but he did not play.

Club statistics
Updated to 19 December 2021.

Honours

Club
Urawa Red Diamonds
Emperor's Cup: 2018, 2021
Japanese Super Cup: 2022

References

External links

Profile at Urawa Red Diamonds
Profile at Vissel Kobe

1994 births
Living people
Association football people from Hyōgo Prefecture
Japanese footballers
Japan youth international footballers
J1 League players
J2 League players
J3 League players
Vissel Kobe players
J.League U-22 Selection players
Urawa Red Diamonds players
Footballers at the 2014 Asian Games
Footballers at the 2016 Summer Olympics
Olympic footballers of Japan
Association football defenders
Asian Games competitors for Japan